Krylov is a Russian surname.

Krylov may also refer to:

 Krylov (crater), a lunar crater
 Krylov Peninsula, an Antarctic peninsula
 Krylov State Research Center, a state-owned shipbuilding research institute
 5247 Krylov, an asteroid
 a Krylov subspace
 the Krylov-Bogolyubov theorem
 Krylov FA-37 Assault Rifle, a fictitious weapon in Battlefield 2142
 former name of Novogeorgievsk